The Cook Islands is a net importer of energy, in the form of petroleum products. Total energy consumption was 1,677,278,000 BTU (1.77 TJ) in 2017, of which 811,000,000 (0.86 TJ) was in the form of oil. In 2012 47% of imported oil was used in the transport sector, 30% in aviation, and 27% for electricity generation. Electricity consumption is 31.6 GWh, from 14 MW of installed generation capacity, with most load concentrated on the main island of Rarotonga. Per-capita electricity consumption is approximately two-thirds that in the European Union.  Greenhouse gas emissions total 88,810 t per year, or 10.36 t per capita.

Electricity in the Cook Islands was historically produced by diesel generators on each island. Fuel was imported from Auckland and required long sea voyages to get to the northern atolls, resulting in high costs and occasional supply disruptions. The major islands of Rarotonga and Manihiki had 24-hour electricity, but the smaller islands would often turn their power off overnight. Since 2011 the Cook Islands has embarked on a programme of renewable energy development to improve its energy security and reduce greenhouse gas emissions, with a goal of reaching 100% renewable electricity by 2020.

85% of the country's fuel and all of its jet fuel is imported by Pacific Energy.

Governmental jurisdiction
The Energy Act 1998 established an Energy Division within the Ministry of Works, Energy and Physical Planning (now Infrastructure Cook Islands) responsible for energy policy and electricity inspections. Electricity on Rarotonga is provided by Te Aponga Uira (TAU), a government-owned power authority established by legislation. The environmental impact of energy projects is managed by the National Environmental Service under the Environment Act 2003. Renewable energy is coordinated by a Renewable Energy Development Division in the Office of the Prime Minister.

See also
 Economy of the Cook Islands
 Renewable energy in the Cook Islands

References